The Thermomix is a multi-purpose kitchen appliance made by the Vorwerk Corporate Group. The current Thermomix has a heating element, a motor for fast or slow blending and stirring, and a weighing scale. The functions can be accessed simultaneously to carry out steaming, emulsifying, blending, precise heating, mixing, milling, whipping, kneading, chopping, weighing, grinding and stirring. The 2014 Thermomix TM5 also has a touchscreen with a guided mode which allows the user to follow recipes step by step.

"Thermomix" is a hybrid word derived from Greek "thermo" (heating) and English "mix". In Italy and Portugal, it is sold under the trademark Bimby.

History 

The Thermomix was derived from a mixer series from Vorwerk originally called "VKM5", in 1961. It had seven functions: stirring, kneading, chopping, grating, mixing, milling and juicing. The justification for the development of the heating element comes from the managing director of Vorwerk France, who around 1970 came up with the idea of designing a machine that could simultaneously blend and cook, to make thickened soups and baby food, popular in France. In 1971 the original Thermomix VM 2000 was launched on the market – first in France, later in Spain and Italy.

The bright orange VM 2200 followed, with the ability to keep dishes hot or cold. The TM3300, the first version named "Thermomix", was released in 1985, with a white finish and having the mixing bowl lower than the previous model.

The next model, the Thermomix TM21, was released in 1996, with a bigger bowl, integrated weighing scale and a more modern appearance.TM5 incorporates digital technologies, and allows "guided cooking" using proprietary memory chips to provide settings and cooking instructions, and a touch screen instead of the buttons and knobs of previous models.

The chronology of Thermomix models is as follows:

 Thermomix VKM5 (1961)
 Thermomix VM 10 (1960s)
 Thermomix VM 2000 (1971)
 Thermomix VM 2200 (1977)
 Thermomix TM 3000 (1980)
 Thermomix TM 3300 (1982)
 Thermomix TM 21 (1996)
 Thermomix TM 31 (2004)
 Thermomix TM 5 (2014)
 Thermomix TM 6 (2019)

75% of the machines sold are made in Cloyes-sur-le-Loir, France, and the rest in Wuppertal-Laaken, Germany. Both factories have been expanded.

Features 

The price at launch in its home country was €1,139.

Marketing and distribution 

The Thermomix is sold through direct sales by a sales force of "Thermomix consultants", who are encouraged to recruit other consultants to work under them.  The Guardian said the approach "resembles multilevel marketing".

Vorwerk claims the appliance may be used to prepare complete meals with no need for advanced culinary knowledge.

Models 

The TM6 was announced in March 2019 and has a number of new features including slow cooking, fermentation and sous vide.

The TM5 is a digital machine. It can be purchased with an optional ‘Cook-Key’ WiFi add-on, which allows access to a subscription-based online recipe catalogue. The TM5 is equipped with guided cooking. The user interface is accessed through a touch screen, as opposed to the previous model’s buttons.

In the TM31, recipes can only be followed manually by operating the machine with push buttons, without the guided recipe feature of the newer model. However, it can do many of the same things as the TM5.

Reviews 
In 2010 Stiftung Warentest rated the model TM 31 with mark 3.2 (satisfactory). The price of 985 euro, the high noise level, and the lack of grating and slicing functionality was criticised. The successor model TM 5 was rated in 2015 with mark 2.9 (satisfactory). The noise level (measured at 91 decibel) was again criticised, and the testers said that this was the reason why it was rated down.

In 2014 Vorwerk was awarded a critical "Shonky Award" by the Australian consumer advocate Choice, for the "flawed launch of its new model".

In 2016 the TM5 was rated 4 out of 5 stars in C|Net and had a positive review on Wired.

In 2018, iFixit published a teardown of the Thermomix TM5. Without giving a repairability score, they praised the modular conception and criticized the poor accessibility of some connections.

Safety 

There have been numerous accounts of a Thermomix machine "exploding" and scalding people with hot liquids. In October 2014 the model was recalled over claims that hot liquid or food may splash out of the mixing bowl. The Australian consumer organisation Choice called for an Australian Competition & Consumer Commission (ACCC) investigation. In June 2017 the ACCC started court proceedings against the Australian Thermomix distributor, alleging that it breached Australian Consumer Law, failed to comply with mandatory reporting requirements for injuries, asked consumers to sign non-disclosure agreements, and made false and misleading statements about its 2014 recall.

Choice told the Australian Broadcasting Corporation (ABC) that it was aware of 87 cases where Thermomix consumers had been burned. The ABC understood that 18 of those required several weeks of treatment in hospital burns units.

In April 2018 Thermomix in Australia was handed a $4.6 million fine because they had violated consumer law by failing to report dangerous defects.

In 2014 Thermomix TM31 (12423100 to 14323199) was recalled in Australia. The ACCC issued recall notice 2014/14361 in October 2014. The sealing ring was identified as a point of possible failure in circumstances where the machine was operated at high speed and then switched to the lid open position. Vorwerk shipped all affected owners a replacement sealing ring in November 2014.

References

Cooking appliances